Tritomegas is a genus of shield bugs.

Species
 Tritomegas bicolor (Linnaeus, 1758) - the pied shieldbug  
 Tritomegas micans (Horváth, 1899)
 Tritomegas rotundipennis (Dohrn, 1862)
 Tritomegas sexmaculatus (Rambur, 1839)
 Tritomegas theryi (Lindberg, 1932)

References

Pentatomomorpha genera
Cydnidae